AML  may refer to:

People 
 AML, stage name of Canadian TV producer, TV host and singer Anne-Marie Losique

Companies, organizations, associations 
 Academia Mexicana de la Lengua, or Mexican Academy of Language, a national academy in Mexico responsible for regulating the Spanish language
 Africa Morocco Link, a ferry company
 Association for Mormon Letters, established for the promotion and criticism of Mormon writing
 Association of Muslim Lawyers (UK)
 Australian Institute for Machine Learning, at Lot Fourteen, Adelaide

Computers and telecommunications 
 A Manufacturing Language (AML, AML/2, AML/V, AML/X), an IBM robot programming language and its derivatives
 ACPI Machine Language a specialized programming language that forms part of the Advanced Configuration and Power Interface
 Additional Military Layers, a military standard of exchanging authoritative maritime geospatial information data, covered by STANAG 7170 
 Advanced Mobile Location, a geolocation system on smartphones that facilitates emergency services
 Algebraic modeling language, programming languages for describing and solving problems of high complexity
 ARC Macro Language, a high-level algorithmic language for the ArcInfo Geographic Information System
 Automated machine learning (AutoML), the process of automating the end-to-end process of applying machine learning to real-world problems
 Microsoft Assistance Markup Language, an XML-based markup language

Transport 
 Acton Main Line railway station, England
 Aston Martin Lagonda Limited, English automaker
 Panhard AML, French armoured car of Cold War era

Medicine 
 Acute myeloid leukemia, a form of cancer
 Angiomyolipoma, a benign type of kidney tumour

Other uses 
 Anti-money laundering, an umbrella term for regulations that aim to prevent money-laundering.
 Anti Monopoly Law of China
 Abandoned mine lands
 Awaken, My Love!, the third studio album by Childish Gambino